Lamonte trevallis is an Ichnospecies from the late Ediacaran sediments of the Yangtze Gorges of Southern China.	
 It represented fairly large traces that indicate burrowing behaviour. It had Millimetre-sized traces preserved differently than other Ichnofossils from that time period. Surface-dwelling trackways, vertical burrows and horizontal tunnels are a common characteristic of the trace fossil.

See also 
List of Ediacaran genera

References

Trace fossils